Delhi University Students Union, generally abbreviated as DUSU, is a students' union at the University of Delhi.  It is primarily responsible for building and preserving a healthy political culture and an atmosphere of open debates on the campus. Students are kept informed about the public meetings, discussions and other issues through pamphlets and notices. The Students' Union has four central panel positions. These are the posts of President, Vice President, Secretary and Joint-Secretary

DUSU elections
The university has a long history of student political activity.

Each constituent college of the University of Delhi elects its own students' union annually. In addition, the DUSU exists as an umbrella organisation for those colleges. Several office bearers of DUSU have gone on to hold public office at local, state and national level.

.As of 2019 there are total of 52 Delhi University colleges & faculties affiliated to DUSU.

Notable Office Bearers of DUSU include Arun Jaitley who was a member of Akhil Bharatiya Vidyarthi Parishad (ABVP) and became the President of DUSU in 1974. Vijay Goel became the DUSU President in 1977-78. Ajay Maken was the General Secretary of Indian National Congress till 2015. He was elected as the President of DUSU in 1985. Alka Lamba is a former President of National Students Union of India (NSUI) and was the President of DUSU in 1995. Anil Jha Vats is a member of the BJP and was a former member of the Delhi Legislative Assembly. He was the President of DUSU for 1997-98. Vijay Jolly was a former member of ABVP and is currently a member of BJP. He was elected the President of DUSU for 1980-81.

Office bearers

Notable student organisations
Some of the notable student organisations are:
 Students' Federation of India
 All India Democratic Students Organisation  
 National Students' Union of India 
 All India Students Federation 
 All India Students Association 
 Akhil Bharatiya Vidyarthi Parishad

References

Delhi University
Students' unions in India